Giordano Giulio Abbondati (29 May 1948 – 21 April 2005) was an Italian figure skater and seven-time national champion in 1961–66 and 1968. He competed in several European and World Championships in the 1960s, in addition to the 1964 and 1968 Winter Olympic Games, in both of which he placed 14th.

Giordano retired from figure skating in 1968 to pursue a career in medicine but continued to be involved in figure skating as an international competition judge for many years. He married fellow judge Hely Rainesalo-Abbondati of Finland in 1974 and moved to Helsinki, Finland. He later moved to the UK with his wife and two children, where he practised as a consultant anesthesiologist at Central Middlesex Hospital in London, becoming Head of Anaesthetics and later Clinical Director of the pioneering Ambulatory Care and Diagnostics Centre (ACAD) which opened in 1999. He died from natural causes in 2005.

Results

References
 

Italian male single skaters
1948 births
2005 deaths
Olympic figure skaters of Italy
Figure skaters at the 1964 Winter Olympics
Figure skaters at the 1968 Winter Olympics
Figure skaters from Milan